The following is a list of Primera División de Fútbol Profesional coaches — only including lists of current coaches

Achievements

The following table shows the Primera Division head coaches that have won the Primera division.

List of all-time coaches 
The list of coaches includes everyone who has coached a club while they were in the Primera division, whether in a permanent or temporary role. Interim coaches are listed only when they managed the team for at least one match in that period.

External links

Primera Division